Africella is a genus of snout moths. It was described by George Hampson in 1930 and contains the species Africella micraeola. It is found in Ghana.

References

Phycitinae
Monotypic moth genera
Moths of Africa